Luuk Johannes van Middelaar (born 9 May 1973 in Eindhoven) is a Dutch historian and political philosopher. From December 2009 to 2014 he was a member of the cabinet of Herman Van Rompuy, the first full-time President of the European Council. Van Middelaar is best known for his book The Passage to Europe (originally published in 2009 and widely translated).

Van Middelaar studied history and philosophy at the University of Groningen and the Centre Raymond Aron of the École des Hautes Études en Sciences Sociale in Paris. In 1999 his master's thesis (doctoraalscriptie in Dutch)  was published as Politicide and awarded the Prix de Paris and the Prize for Liberty (Nova Civitas). He became for a time an adviser and speechwriter to Frits Bolkestein (2002-2004) and Jozias van Aartsen (2004-2006). In 2009 he received his PhD from the University of Amsterdam with a cum laude distinction. In 2012 he was awarded the European Book Prize and the Prix Louis Martin for The Passage to Europe and Socrates Prize in 2010 for the best philosophy book written in Dutch.

Since early 2015 he has had a weekly political column in NRC Handelsblad, taking up again a position he held from 2008 to 2009. In 2015 he was appointed Professor of the Foundations and Practice of the European Union and Its Institutions at Leiden University in the Netherlands. He also holds a chair in European Values at the French-speaking Catholic University of Louvain in Belgium. Since 2018 he has been a member of the Dutch Advisory Council on International Affairs.

Bibliography

Books written by van Middelaar
 Politicide: De moord op de politiek in de Franse filosofie (Politicide: The Murder of Politics in French Philosophy; master's thesis, published in the series Kennis, openbare mening, politiek). Amsterdam: Van Gennep, 1999.
 De passage naar Europa, Geschiedenis van een begin. Groningen: Historische uitgeverij, 2009. Translated into 11 languages.
 Translated into French 2012 as Le passage à l'Europe. Histoire d'un commencement. Paris: Gallimard. Revised edition with a new foreword.
 Translated into English 2013 as The Passage to Europe: How a Continent Became a Union. London and New Haven, CT: Yale University Press. Revised edition (including a Commentary section) with a new preface.
 Translated into German 2016 as Vom Kontinent zur Union - Gegenwart und Geschichte des vereinten Europa. Berlin:Suhrkamp. New forewoonce more rd.
 Improvisatie & Oppositie: De nieuwe politiek van Europa. Groningen: Historische Uitgeverij, 2017.
 Translated into French 2018 as Quand l’Europe improvise: dix ans de crises politiques. Paris: Gallimard, Le Débat. Updated version.
 Translated into English 2019 as Alarums and Excursions: Improvising Politics on the European Stage. New York: Agenda Publishing.
 Een Europees pandemonium: Kwetsbaarheid en politieke kracht (A European pandemonium: Vulnerability and political power). Groningen: Historische Uitgeverij, 2021.
 Translated into English 2021 as Pandemonium: Saving Europe. Newcastle upon Tyne: Agenda Publishing.

Books co-edited by van Middelaar
 with Madelon de Keizer: Utopie: utopisch denken, doen en bouwen in de twintigste eeuw (Utopia: Utopian Thinking, Acting and Building in the Twentieth Century) (Jaarboek van het Nederlands Instituut voor Oorlogsdocumentatie). Zutphen: Walburg Pers, 2002.
 with Philippe Van Parijs: After the Storm: How to Save Democracy in Europe with contributions from, among others, Amartya Sen, Pierre Manent, Jürgen Habermas, Ivan Krastev, David Miller, Pierre Rosanvallon and Larry Siedentop. Tielt: Lannoo, 2015.

Selected articles
Van Middelaar writes for various European journals and newspapers including Le Débat, Le Monde.
 "Three Things the EU Must Do to Survive", The Guardian, 27 March 2017.

Notes

External links
 Politicide - from the Foundation for the Production and Translation of Dutch Literature
  Luuk van Middelaar - Columns NRC Handelsblad
 Luuk van Middelaar - Personal website

1973 births
Living people
20th-century Dutch philosophers
21st-century Dutch philosophers
21st-century Dutch historians
Political philosophers
University of Amsterdam alumni
People from Eindhoven